Calineuria californica, the western stone, is a species of common stonefly in the family Perlidae. It is found in North America.

References

External links

 

Perlidae
Articles created by Qbugbot
Insects described in 1905